The Scent Of Crash And Burn is an EP by Centrozoon (Markus Reuter and Bernhard Wöstheinrich), featuring No-Man singer Tim Bowness as a guest vocalist; the first in a series of releases by this trio configuration which included both CD and vinyl albums, digital-releases, as well as a DVD.

Selected tracks from The Scent Of Crash And Burn were reworked (either as remixes or edits) for subsequent releases. For example, the title track was edited by co-producer Lee Fletcher for inclusion on the follow-up album Never Trust The Way You Are.

Track listing
All songs written by Bowness/Reuter/Wöstheinrich
 "Ten Versions of America" (TRG Radio Edit)
 "Make Me Forget You"
 "The Me I Knew"
 "The Scent of Crash and Burn"
 "Ten Versions of America"

Personnel
 Tim Bowness – vocals, lyrics
 Markus Reuter – touch guitar
 Bernhard Wöstheinrich – synths and programming
 Philipp Münch – additional arrangements on 01
 Lee Fletcher – drum programming on 02

Production
 Producer: Lee Fletcher, and Centrozoon
 Mixing: Lee Fletcher, (except 05 by Markus Reuter and Lee Fletcher)
 Engineering: Philipp Quaet-Faslem

Design
Design: Bernhard Wöstheinrich

References

2003 EPs
Centrozoon albums
Collaborative albums